The 2019 Nigeria Women Premier League began July 24, 2019. The league was earlier scheduled to start in February, but due to logistic reasons and commencement of other competitions, it was postponed to March, May then later July. Prior to the start of the league, a congress was held in Abuja on June 27, with representatives from Nigeria Football Federation. Due to failure of some teams to pay their indemnities, the agreed date at the congress was shifted from July 17 to July 24.  

At the end of the 2018 Nigeria Women Premier League, Pelican Stars and Sure Babes were relegated to the lower division while Dream Stars Ladies and Invincible Angels gained promotion to the League. Bayelsa Queens returns as defending champions, while Kaduna Queens bought the slot of Jokodolu Babes to compete in the elite division. 

At the end of the regular season, Confluence Queens, Bayelsa Queens, Rivers Angels and Adamawa Queens topped their group, thereby qualifying for the super 4 competition to determine the overall winner of the league, while Osun Babes, Dream Stars Ladies, Kaduna Queens and Invincible Angels proceed to relegation playoffs.

Format
For the 2019 season, an abridged league format of four groups was adopted with four teams in each group. The top team in each of the four groups will play a super four mini-tournament at the end of the league to determine the overall winner of the league. The last placed team in each group will engage in a playoff to determine the two teams that will be relegated to the lower division.

Major transfers 
The league saw the arrival of two Gambian internationals, Penda Bah and Isatou Jallow joining Rivers Angels and Dream Stars Ladies (with Jallow later joining Angels) respectively. Other major transfers included the arrival of 2018 second top scorer, Anjor Major to league winners, Bayelsa Queens. Rofiat Sule, who was the top scorer during the 2016 and 2017 season also moved from Rivers Angels to Bayelsa Queens in a deal that is considered as the biggest in the history of Nigerian women club football. In August 2019, former captain of Ghana women's national under-20 football team, Grace Adams signed a year deal with Rivers Angels from a team in the United States.

Non-Nigerian players during 2019 season

Finals table

Group A

Group B

Group C

Group D

Play-off stages

Relegation play-offs

 Kaduna Queens and Invincible Angels were relegated to the Pro-league.

Super 4

Semi-finals

 Confluence Queens and Rivers Angels qualified to the Final.

Third place match

Final

Nigeria Women Pro-league play-offs

Four teams qualified for the promotion playoffs;
Olori Babes, Pelican Stars, Police Female Machine, Moje Queens. The four teams would play each other once in a round robin tournament, the two highest ranked teams shall be promoted to the 2020 Nigeria Women Premier League.

All matches were played at the Confluence Stadium in Lokoja.

Round 1

Round 2

Round 3

References

External links
Nigeria 2019 at RSSF

Nigeria Women Premier League seasons
N
Wom
N
Wom